Karlheinz Essl (born 15 August 1960) is an Austrian composer, performer, sound artist, improviser, and composition teacher.

Biography 
Essl was born in Vienna. His studies at the University of Music in Vienna included: composition (under Friedrich Cerha), electro-acoustic music (under Dieter Kaufmann) and double bass. At the University of Vienna he studied  musicology (1989 doctoral thesis on Das Synthese-Denken bei Anton Webern). In 1990-94 he was "composer in residence" at the Darmstädter Ferienkurse für Neue Musik, while in 1992-93 he worked on a commission at IRCAM in Paris. From 1992 to 2016, he was the music curator of the Essl Collection  in Klosterneuburg/Vienna. Between 1995–2006 he taught Algorithmic composition at the Studio for Advanced Music & Media Technology at the Anton Bruckner Private University for Music, Drama, and Dance in Linz, Austria. As of 2007, Essl is professor of composition for electro-acoustic and experimental music at the University of Music and Performing Arts, Vienna.

Characterisation 
Karlheinz Essl's work with computers (with emphasis on algorithmic composition and generative music) and a prolonged occupation with the poetics of serial music have been a formative influence on his compositional thinking. Besides writing instrumental music, Karlheinz Essl also works in the field of electronic music, interactive realtime compositions and sound installations. Since the early 1990s, he has developed various software environments for realtime composition which he uses himself for his own live performances and also in collaboration with artists from other fields (choreographers, dancers, visual artists and poets).

In 1998, Essl started to develop a computer-based electronic instrument called m@ze°2 which he uses as an improviser in live performances. Since 2008, he is working on a series of compositions for various solo instruments and live electronics named Sequitur. Recently he has written several solo and ensemble pieces for electric guitar.

Projects 
Since the 1990s, Karlheinz Essl carried out a number of projects for the Internet and became increasingly involved with improvisation. In 1997, Karlheinz Essl was featured at the Salzburg Festival with portrait concerts and sound installations. In 2003, he was artist-in-residence of the festival musik aktuell, and in 2004 he was presented with a series of portrait concerts at the Brucknerhaus Linz. 2008–2009 he was composer-in-residence of the Belgium ensemble Champ d'Action.

Selected works
 Helix 1.0 for string quartet (1986)
 met him pike trousers for large orchestra (1987)
 Rudiments for 4 snare drums (1989)
 Close the Gap for 3 tenor saxophones (1989)
 ...et consumimur igni for 3 ensemble groups (1990)
 In's Offene! flute, bass clarinet, violin and cello (1991)
 Entsagung for ensemble and electronics (1993)
 Lexikon-Sonate infinite realtime composition for computer-controlled piano (1992–2007)
 Déviation for ensemble (1993)
 absence for violin solo (1996)
 à trois/seul for string trio (1998)
 mise en scène for 10 instruments (1998)
 more or less realtime composition for soloists and electronics (1999–2002)
 upward, behind the onstreaming it mooned for string quartet (2001)
 blur for flute, cello and vibraphone (2003)
 Faites vos jeux! a musical card game for cellos and/or trombones (2004)
 Kalimba for toy piano and playback (2005)
 colorado for saxophone quartet and live-electronics (2005–2008)
 Von Hirschen und Röhren sound installation for Beat Zoderer (2006–2007)
 7x7 for 4 clarinets, 4 saxophones, 4 trombones or 4 electric guitars (2006–2009)
 AIRBORNE open-air sound environment (2006)
 Cinq for woodwind quintet (2007)
 FRÄULEIN ATLANTIS generative sound and video environment for Jonathan Meese (2007)
 Sequitur cycle for 14 different solo instruments and live-electronics (2008/2009)
 while my guitars gently whip for 4 electric guitars (2008/2009)
 Detune for oboe and large orchestra (2009)
 Chemi(s)e for electric guitar and 2 ensemble groups (2009)
 whatever shall be for toy piano, dreidel, music box and live-electronics (2010) 
 LABoratorio mixed-media performance for viola, percussions, live-electronics, dancers and video (2010/2011)
 juncTions for grand piano (two players) and live-electronics (2011/2012)
 Si! for tenor tuba (or trombone), live-electronics and surround sound (2012)
 under wood for two amplified toy pianos (one player) and ensemble (2012)
 Miles to go for 4 prepared and amplified toy pianos (2012)
 STERN for electric violin and vibration speaker (2013)
 Pachinko for toy piano and computer (2013)
 VIRIBVS VNITIS for toy piano and harpsichord (2014)
 RESONAVIT for zither, electric violin and vibration speaker (2014)
 Omnia in omnibus sound/video/performance for the 650th anniversary of the University of Vienna (2014)
 Autumn's leaving for pipa and live-electronics (2015)
 imagination soundtrack for a paper theater piece (2015)
 river_run for guzheng and live-electronics (2016)
 exit*glue for trombone and electric guitar (2016)

Music software 
Amazing Maze: interactive realtime composition for sampled sound particles
Lexikon-Sonate: algorithmic music generator
fLOW: ambient soundscape generator
REplay PLAYer: generative sound file shredder
SEELEWASCHEN: ambient sound environment based on the sound of a bell
FontanaMixer: generative sound environment based on John Cage's Fontana Mix
WebernUhrWerk: generative music generator in memory of Anton Webern

Records 
ruderals: free improvisations for zither and electronics, with Martin Mallaun (Nachtstück Records 2014)
WAGNERIANA: Three Deconstructions on Richard Wagner (Radical Matters 2013)
whatever shall be: music for toy instruments and electronics, performed by Isabel Ettenauer (Edition Eirelav 2013)
Gold.Berg.Werk: interpretation of J.S. Bach's Goldberg Variations for string trio and electronics (Preiser Records 2008)
SNDTX: electronic music #3 (tlhotra #23 2008) - free download from archive.org
©RUDE: electronic music #2 (Lotus Records 2001)
m@ze°2: electronic music #1 (KHE 1999) - free download as mp3 from last.fm
Rudiments: instrumental compositions 1986–1993 (TONOS 1995)

See also 
List of ambient music artists

References

External links

 www.essl.at: official website
Karlheinz Essl interviewed by Julieanne Klein (2010)
Karlheinz Essl interviewed by Bruce Duffie (1997)
 

1960 births
Living people
Musicians from Vienna
20th-century classical composers
21st-century classical composers
Austrian male classical composers
Twelve-tone and serial composers
20th-century male musicians
21st-century male musicians